Roman Zhersh (born 2 December 1985) is a Ukrainian former footballer.

He previously played for FC Dinamo Brest in Belarus.

External links

1985 births
Living people
Ukrainian footballers
Association football midfielders
Ukrainian expatriate footballers
Expatriate footballers in Belarus
FC Volyn Lutsk players
FC Kovel-Volyn Kovel players
FC Ikva Mlyniv players
FC Dynamo Brest players
FC Hoverla Uzhhorod players
FC Nyva Ternopil players
FC Zirka Kropyvnytskyi players